is a retired Japanese swimmer, who specialized in butterfly events. Osada won two bronze medals in the 200 m butterfly and the medley relay at the 2003 Summer Universiade in Daegu, South Korea.

Osada qualified for the women's 200 m butterfly at the 2004 Summer Olympics in Athens, by attaining an A-standard entry time of 2:09.97 from the national championships. In the morning's preliminary heats, she recorded the eighth fastest qualifying time of 2:11.20 to secure her spot in the semifinal run. On the evening session, Osada failed to qualify for the final run, as she placed thirteenth overall in the semifinals, with a fourth slowest time of 2:11.35.

References

External links
Profile – Japanese Olympic Committee 

1981 births
Living people
Olympic swimmers of Japan
Swimmers at the 2004 Summer Olympics
Japanese female butterfly swimmers
Universiade medalists in swimming
Sportspeople from Yamanashi Prefecture
Universiade bronze medalists for Japan
Medalists at the 2003 Summer Universiade
21st-century Japanese women